The Governor of the Cayman Islands is the representative of the British monarch in the United Kingdom's overseas territory of the Cayman Islands. The Governor, a civil servant who has in modern times typically been a British subject normally resident in the United Kingdom, is appointed by the monarch from the staff of the Foreign, Commonwealth and Development Office on the advice of the British government. The role of the Governor is to act as the de facto head of state, and is responsible for appointing the Premier, who is the leader of the party with a majority of seats in the Legislature.

The Governorship is held by Martyn Roper since October 2018.

The Governor has his own flag, the Union Flag defaced with the territory's coat of arms. The official residence of the Governor is Government House in Seven Mile Beach, Grand Cayman.

History
Until 1962, the Cayman Islands were administered as a dependency of Jamaica. When Jamaica gained independence, the Islands were split and became a separate Crown colony. An Administrator was appointed to the Islands from 1959. After 1971, the British Government appointed a Governor.

List of chief magistrates of the Cayman Islands
 William Cartwright (1750–1776)
 William Bodden (1776–1823)
 James Coe the Elder (1823–1829)
 John Drayton (1829–1842)
 James Coe the Younger (1842–1855)
 William Eden (1855–1879)
 William Bodden Webster (1879–1888)
 Edmund Parsons (1888–1907)

List of commissioners of the Cayman Islands
 Frederick Shedden Sanguinetti (1898–1906)
 George Stephenson Hirst (1907–1912)
 Arthur C Robinson (1912–1919)
 Hugh Houston Hutchings (1919–1929)
 Captain G. H. Frith (1929–1931)
 Ernest Arthur Weston (1931–1934) 
 Allan Wolsey Cardinall, CMG (later Sir Allan) (1934–1940)
 Albert C. Panton Snr, MBE (acting) (1940–1941)
 John Perry Jones (1941–1946)
 Ivor Otterbein Smith (later CMG, OBE) (1946–1952)
 Andrew Morris Gerrard, CMG (1952–1956)
 Alan Hillard Donald (1956 – 4 July 1959)

List of administrators of the Cayman Islands
 Wing Commander Jack Rose CMG, MBE, DFC (1960–1964)
John Alfred Cumber CMG, MBE, TD (1964–1968)
Athelstan Charles Ethelwulf Long (1968 – August 22, 1971)

List of governors of the Cayman Islands
Athelstan Charles Ethelwulf Long (22 August 1971 – 1972)
Kenneth Roy Crook (1972–1974)
Thomas Russell (1974–1981)
George Peter Lloyd (1982 – 10 June 1987)
Alan James Scott (June 10, 1987 – September 14, 1992)
Michael Edward John Gore (14 September 1992 – 16 October 1995)
John Wynne Owen (16 October 1995 – 5 May 1999)
Peter Smith (5 May 1999 – 9 May 2002)
Bruce Dinwiddy (19 May 2002 – 28 October 2005)
Stuart Jack (23 November 2005 – 2 December 2009)
Duncan Taylor (15 January 2010 – 7 August 2013)
Helen Kilpatrick (6 September 2013 – 5 March 2018)
Anwar Choudhury (26 March 2018 – October 2018)
Martyn Roper (October 2018 – present)

References

External links
Cayman Islands Government
Cayman Islands @ worldstatesmen.org

 
Politics of the Cayman Islands